The Charles D. Lewis House is a historic house in Sherborn, Massachusetts.  It is a two-story wood-frame structure, set on a brick and rubblestone foundation, and exhibits informal Shingle style massing with elements of formal Colonial Revival detail.  The house is built in a wide V-shape opening to the north, its main entrance south-facing with porches, but, within the angled facades to the north, a circular driveway and port-cochere entry, supported by Tuscan columns.  It was built as a gentleman's farm and one of the town's earliest summer residences circa 1905, by Charles D. Lewis, a businessman whose family owned Lewis Wharf in Boston.

The house was listed on the National Register of Historic Places in 1986.

See also
National Register of Historic Places listings in Sherborn, Massachusetts

References

Houses in Sherborn, Massachusetts
Houses on the National Register of Historic Places in Middlesex County, Massachusetts
Shingle Style houses
Colonial Revival architecture in Massachusetts
Shingle Style architecture in Massachusetts